Petroleum Institute of Pakistan (PIP), is based in Islamabad, Pakistan. The PIP was established in 1963 to represents all the segments of the gas and petroleum industry in Pakistan. PIP works closely with the Ministry of Petroleum and Natural Resources. The Hydrocarbon Development Institute of Pakistan (HDIP) is the national petroleum Research and Development (R&D) organization that coordinates with the PIP.

See also

 Hydrocarbon Development Institute of Pakistan
 Ministry of Petroleum and Natural Resources
 Oil and Gas Development Company

References

1963 establishments in Pakistan
Petroleum industry in Pakistan